

Events

Pre-1600
1058 – Agnes of Poitou and Andrew I of Hungary meet to negotiate about the border territory of Burgenland.
1066 – At the Battle of Fulford, Harald Hardrada defeats earls Morcar and Edwin.
1187 – Saladin begins the Siege of Jerusalem.
1260 – The Great Prussian Uprising among the old Prussians begins against the Teutonic Knights.
1378 – Cardinal Robert of Geneva is elected as Pope Clement VII, beginning the Papal schism.
1498 – The Nankai tsunami washes away the building housing the Great Buddha at Kōtoku-in; it has been located outside ever since.
1519 – Ferdinand Magellan sets sail from Sanlúcar de Barrameda with about 270 men on his expedition which ultimately culminates in the first circumnavigation of the globe.
1586 – A number of conspirators in the Babington Plot are hanged, drawn and quartered.

1601–1900
1602 – The Spanish-held Dutch town of Grave capitulates to a besieging Dutch and English army under the command of Maurice of Orange.
1697 – The Treaty of Ryswick is signed by France, England, Spain, the Holy Roman Empire and the Dutch Republic, ending the Nine Years' War.
1737 – The Walking Purchase concludes, which forces the cession of 1.2 million acres (4,860 km2) of Lenape-Delaware tribal land to the Pennsylvania Colony.
1792 – French troops stop an allied invasion of France at the Battle of Valmy.
1835 – The decade-long Ragamuffin War starts when rebels capture Porto Alegre in Brazil.
1854 – Crimean War: British and French troops defeat Russians at the Battle of Alma.
1857 – The Indian Rebellion of 1857 ends with the recapture of Delhi by troops loyal to the East India Company.
1860 – The future King Edward VII of the United Kingdom begins the first visit to North America by a Prince of Wales.
1863 – American Civil War: The Battle of Chickamauga, in northwestern Georgia, ends in a Confederate victory.
1870 – The Bersaglieri corps enter Rome through the Porta Pia, and complete the unification of Italy.
1871 – Bishop John Coleridge Patteson, first bishop of Melanesia, is martyred on Nukapu, now in the Solomon Islands.
1881 – U.S. President Chester A. Arthur is sworn in upon the death of James A. Garfield the previous day.
1893 – Charles Duryea and his brother road-test the first American-made gasoline-powered automobile.

1901–present
1911 – The White Star Line's  collides with the British warship .
1920 – Irish War of Independence: British police known as "Black and Tans" burn the town of Balbriggan and kill two local men in revenge for an IRA assassination.
1941 – The Holocaust in Lithuania: Lithuanian Nazis and local police begin a mass execution of 403 Jews in Nemenčinė. 
1942 – The Holocaust in Ukraine: In the course of two days a German Einsatzgruppe murders at least 3,000 Jews in Letychiv.
1946 – The first Cannes Film Festival is held, having been delayed for seven years due to World War II.
  1946   – Six days after a referendum, King Christian X of Denmark annuls the declaration of independence of the Faroe Islands. 
1955 – The Treaty on Relations between the USSR and the GDR is signed.
1961 – Greek general Konstantinos Dovas becomes Prime Minister of Greece.
1962 – James Meredith, an African American, is temporarily barred from entering the University of Mississippi.
1965 – Following the Battle of Burki, the Indian Army captures Dograi in during the Indo-Pakistani War of 1965.
1967 – The Cunard Liner Queen Elizabeth 2 is launched in Clydebank, Scotland.
1971 – Having weakened after making landfall in Nicaragua the previous day, Hurricane Irene regains enough strength to be renamed Hurricane Olivia, making it the first known hurricane to cross from the Atlantic Ocean into the Pacific.
1973 – Billie Jean King beats Bobby Riggs in the Battle of the Sexes tennis match at the Houston Astrodome.
  1973   – Singer Jim Croce, songwriter and musician Maury Muehleisen and four others die when their light aircraft crashes on takeoff at Natchitoches Regional Airport in Louisiana.
1977 – Vietnam is admitted to the United Nations.
1979 – A French-supported coup d'état in the Central African Empire overthrows Emperor Bokassa I.
1982 – NFL season: American football players in the National Football League begin a 57-day strike.
1984 – A suicide bomber in a car attacks the U.S. embassy in Beirut, Lebanon, killing twenty-two people.
1989 – USAir Flight 5050 crashes into Bowery Bay during a rejected takeoff from LaGuardia Airport, killing two people.
1990 – South Ossetia declares its independence from Georgia.
2000 – The United Kingdom's MI6 Secret Intelligence Service building is attacked by individuals using a Russian-built RPG-22 anti-tank missile.
2001 – In an address to a joint session of Congress and the American people, U.S. President George W. Bush declares a "War on Terror".
2003 – Civil unrest in the Maldives breaks out after a prisoner is killed by guards.
2007 – Between 15,000 and 20,000 protesters march on Jena, Louisiana, United States, in support of six black youths who had been convicted of assaulting a white classmate.
2008 – A dump truck full of explosives detonates in front of the Marriott hotel in Islamabad, Pakistan, killing 54 people and injuring 266 others.
2011 – The United States military ends its "don't ask, don't tell" policy, allowing gay men and women to serve openly for the first time.
2017 – Hurricane Maria makes landfall in Puerto Rico as a powerful Category 4 hurricane, resulting in 2,975 deaths, US$90 billion in damage, and a major humanitarian crisis.
2018 – At least 161 people die after a ferry capsizes close to the pier on Ukara Island in Lake Victoria, Tanzania.
2019 – Roughly four million people, mostly students, demonstrate across the world to address climate change. Sixteen-year-old Greta Thunberg from Sweden leads the demonstration in New York City.

Births

Pre-1600
 917 – Kyunyeo, Korean poet (d. 973)
1161 – Emperor Takakura of Japan (d. 1181)
1449 – Philipp I, Count of Hanau-Münzenberg (d. 1500)
1486 – Arthur, Prince of Wales (d. 1502)
1504 – Philip III, Count of Nassau-Weilburg (d. 1559)
1514 – Philipp IV, Count of Hanau-Lichtenberg (d. 1590)
1593 – Gottfried Scheidt, German organist and composer (d. 1661)
1599 – Christian the Younger of Brunswick (d. 1623)

1601–1900
1608 – Jean-Jacques Olier, French priest and mystic, founded the Society of Saint-Sulpice (d. 1657)
1614 – Martino Martini, Italian missionary, cartographer and historian (d. 1661)
1685 – Giuseppe Matteo Alberti, Italian violinist and composer (d. 1751)
1685 – Mateo de Toro Zambrano, 1st Count of La Conquista, President of the First Government Junta of Chile (d. 1811)
1746 – Maurice, Count de Benyovszky, Slovak-Hungarian explorer (d. 1786)
1758 – Jean-Jacques Dessalines, Haitian emperor (d. 1806)
1778 – Fabian Gottlieb von Bellingshausen, Russian admiral, cartographer, and explorer (d. 1852)
1800 – Benjamin Franklin White, American singer and composer (d. 1879)
1815 – Richard Dry, Australian politician, 7th Premier of Tasmania (d. 1869) 
1819 – Frederick Ellsworth Sickels, American inventor (d. 1895)
1820 – John F. Reynolds, American general (d. 1863)
1831 – Kate Harrington, American poet and educator (d. 1917)
1833 – Ernesto Teodoro Moneta, Italian soldier and journalist, Nobel Prize laureate (d. 1918)
1842 – James Dewar, Scottish-English chemist and physicist (d. 1923)
1844 – William H. Illingworth, English-American photographer (d. 1893)
1847 – Susanna Rubinstein, Austrian psychologist (d. 1914)
1851 – Henry Arthur Jones, English playwright and critic (d. 1929)
1853 – Chulalongkorn, Siamese king (d. 1910)
1861 – Herbert Putnam, American lawyer and publisher, 8th Librarian of Congress (d. 1955)
1872 – Maurice Gamelin, French general (d. 1958)
1873 – Sidney Olcott, Canadian-American actor, director, producer, and screenwriter (d. 1949)
  1873   – Ferenc Szisz, Hungarian race car driver (d. 1944)
1875 – Matthias Erzberger, German publicist and politician (d. 1921)
1876 – Carleton Ellis, American inventor and chemist (d. 1941)
1878 – Upton Sinclair, American novelist, critic, and essayist (d. 1968)
  1878   – Francisco Lagos Cházaro, acting president of Mexico (d. 1932)
1880 – Ildebrando Pizzetti, Italian composer, musicologist and critic (d. 1968)
1884 – Maxwell Perkins, American editor (d. 1947)
1885 – Enrico Mizzi, Maltese lawyer and politician, 6th Prime Minister of Malta (d. 1950)
1886 – Charles Williams, English author, poet, and critic (d. 1945)
1889 – Oskar Kaplur, Estonian wrestler (d. 1962)
  1889   – Charles Reidpath, American runner and general (d. 1975)
1890 – Linda Eenpalu, Estonian activist and politician (d. 1967)
1891 – Tomás Garrido Canabal, Mexican revolutionary (d. 1943)
1893 – Colin Fraser Barron, Scottish-Canadian sergeant, Victoria Cross recipient (d. 1958)
  1893   – Hermann Lux, German footballer and manager (d. 1962)
1895 – Walter Dubislav, German logician and philosopher of science (d. 1937)
1899 – Leo Strauss, German-American political scientist, philosopher, and academic (d. 1973)

1901–present
1902 – Stevie Smith, English author and poet (d. 1971)
1906 – Jean Dréville, French actor, director, producer, and screenwriter (d. 1997)
  1906   – Vera Faddeeva, Russian mathematician (d. 1983)
1913 – Sidney Dillon Ripley, American ornithologist and academic (d. 2001)
1914 – Kenneth More, English actor (d. 1982)
1915 – Malik Meraj Khalid, Pakistani politician, Prime Minister of Pakistan (d. 2003)
1917 – Red Auerbach, American basketball player and coach (d. 2006)
  1917   – Olga Dahl, Swedish genealogist (d. 2009)
  1917   – Fernando Rey, Spanish actor (d. 1994)
  1917   – Clarice Taylor, American actress (d. 2011)
  1917   – Obdulio Varela, Uruguayan footballer (d. 1996)
1920 – Jay Ward, American animator, producer, and screenwriter, founded Jay Ward Productions (d. 1989)
1921 – Chico Hamilton, American drummer, composer, and bandleader (d. 2013)
1923 – Akkineni Nageswara Rao, Indian actor and producer (d. 2014)
  1923   – Maurice Sauvé, Canadian economist, academic, and politician (d. 1992)
1924 – Gogi Grant, American singer (d. 2016)
  1924   – Albert Marre, American director, and producer (d. 2012)
  1924   – Jackie Paris, American singer and guitarist (d. 2004)
1925 – James Bernard, English composer and screenwriter (d. 2001)
  1925   – Ananda Mahidol, King Rama VIII of Thailand (d. 1946)
1926 – Libero Liberati, Italian motorcycle racer (d. 1962)
1927 – Colette Bonheur, Canadian singer (d. 1966)
  1927   – John Dankworth, English saxophonist, clarinet player, and composer (d. 2010)
  1927   – Red Mitchell, American bassist, composer, and poet (d. 1992)
  1927   – Rachel Roberts, Welsh actress (d. 1980)
1928 – Alberto de Lacerda, Mozambican-Portuguese poet and radio host (d. 2007)
  1928   – Olga Ferri, Argentinian dancer and choreographer (d. 2012)
  1928   – Donald Hall, American poet, editor, and critic (d. 2018)
1929 – Anne Meara, American actress and playwright (d. 2015)
  1929   – Vittorio Taviani, Italian film director and screenwriter (d. 2018)
  1929   – Joe Temperley, Scottish saxophonist and clarinet player (d. 2016)
1930 – Richard Montague, American mathematician and philosopher (d. 1971)
1931 – Cherd Songsri, Thai director, producer, and screenwriter (d. 2006)
1933 – Dennis Viollet, English footballer and manager (d. 1999)
1934 – Hamit Kaplan, Turkish World and Olympic champion sports wrestler (d. 1976)
  1934   – Sophia Loren, Italian actress 
  1934   – David Marquand, Welsh academic and politician
  1934   – Jeff Morris, American actor (d. 2004)
  1934   – Rajinder Puri, Indian cartoonist, journalist, and activist (d. 2015)
1935 – David Pegg, English footballer (d. 1958)
  1935   – Keith Roberts, English author and illustrator (d. 2000)
  1935   – Jim Taylor, American football player and sportscaster (d. 2018)
1936 – Andrew Davies, Welsh author, screenwriter, and producer
  1936   – Salvador Reyes Monteón, Mexican footballer and manager (d. 2012)
1937 – Birgitta Dahl, Swedish politician, Swedish Minister for the Environment
  1937   – Garry Johnson, English general
  1937   – Monica Zetterlund, Swedish actress and singer (d. 2005)
1938 – Eric Gale, American guitarist and producer (d. 1994)
  1938   – Jane Manning, English soprano and educator (d. 2021)
1940 – Tarō Asō, Japanese target shooter and politician, 92nd Prime Minister of Japan
  1940   – William Finley, American actor (d. 2012)
  1940   – Anna Pavord, Welsh-English journalist and author
1941 – Dale Chihuly, American sculptor and educator
  1941   – Sammy McMillan, Irish footballer
1942 – Rose Francine Rogombé, Gabonese lawyer and politician, President of Gabon (d. 2015)
1944 – Paul Madeley, English footballer (d. 2018)
1946 – Sant Rajinder Singh Ji Maharaj, Spiritual Master, Head of Science of Spirituality
  1946   – Pete Coors, American businessman and politician
  1946   – Markandey Katju, Indian lawyer and judge
1947 – Mia Martini, Italian singer (d. 1995)
  1947   – Patrick Poivre d'Arvor, French journalist and author
1948 – Rey Langit, Filipino journalist and radio host
  1948   – Victoria Mallory, American singer and actress (d. 2014)
  1948   – George R. R. Martin, American novelist and short story writer
  1948   – Chuck Panozzo, American bass player
  1948   – John Panozzo, American drummer (d. 1996)
1949 – Mahesh Bhatt, Indian director, producer, and screenwriter 
1950 – Loredana Bertè, Italian singer
1951 – Guy Lafleur, Canadian ice hockey player (d. 2022) 
  1951   – Javier Marías, Spanish journalist, author, and academic (d. 2022)
  1951   – Greg Valentine, American wrestler
1953 – Rocky Mattioli, Italian-Australian boxer
  1953   – Steve Tom, American actor
1954 – Anne McIntosh, Scottish lawyer and politician
  1954   – Henry Samueli, American businessman, co-founded Broadcom Corporation 
1955 – Betsy Brantley, American actress
  1955   – Johnny Kidd, English wrestler
  1955   – José Rivero, Spanish golfer
1956 – Jennifer Tour Chayes, American mathematician and computer scientist
  1956   – Gary Cole, American actor
  1956   – Steve Coleman, American saxophonist, composer, and bandleader
  1956   – John Harle, English saxophonist, composer, conductor, and producer
1957 – Alannah Currie, New Zealand singer-songwriter 
  1957   – Michael Hurst, New Zealand actor and director
  1957   – Vladimir Tkatchenko, Ukrainian-Russian basketball player
1958 – Arn Anderson, American wrestler and trainer
1959 – Joseph Alessi, American trombonist and educator
  1959   – Joanna Domańska, Polish pianist and educator
  1959   – Meral Okay, Turkish actress, producer, and screenwriter (d. 2012)
1960 – Lee Hall, English playwright and screenwriter
  1960   – Dave Hemingway, English singer-songwriter and drummer 
  1960   – Deborah Roberts, American journalist
1961 – Lisa Bloom, American lawyer and journalist
  1961   – Caroline Flint,  English politician, Minister of State for Europe
  1961   – Erwin Koeman, Dutch retired football player and coach
1962 – Jim Al-Khalili, Iraqi-English physicist, author, and academic
1963 – Anil Dalpat, Pakistani cricketer
1964 – Randy Bradbury, American bass player
1965 – Poul-Erik Høyer Larsen, Danish badminton player
1966 – Nuno Bettencourt, Portuguese singer-songwriter and guitarist
1967 – Roger Anderson, American wrestler 
  1967   – Martin Harrison, American football player
  1967   – Kristen Johnston, American actress
  1967   – Gunnar Nelson, American singer-songwriter and guitarist 
  1967   – Matthew Nelson, American singer-songwriter and bass player 
1968 – Ijaz Ahmed, Pakistani cricketer and coach
  1968   – Philippa Forrester, English television and radio presenter, producer and author
  1968   – Leah Pinsent, Canadian actress
  1968   – Darrell Russell, American race car driver (d. 2004)
  1968   – Norah Vincent, American writer (d. 2022)
1969 – Patrick Pentland, Irish-Canadian singer-songwriter, guitarist, and producer 
  1969   – Tim Rogers, Australian singer-songwriter and guitarist
  1969   – Ben Shepherd, American musician and songwriter
  1969   – Richard Witschge, Dutch footballer and coach
1970 – N'Bushe Wright, American actress and dancer
1971 – Todd Blackadder, New Zealand rugby player and coach
  1971   – Masashi Hamauzu, Japanese pianist and composer
  1971   – Henrik Larsson, Swedish footballer and manager
  1971   – Dominika Peczynski, Swedish singer and television host 
1972 – Victor Ponta, Romanian jurist and politician, 63rd Prime Minister of Romania
1973 – Ronald McKinnon, American football player
  1973   – Jo Pavey, English runner
1975 – Asia Argento, Italian actress
  1975   – Joel Gertner, American wrestling announcer
  1975   – Juan Pablo Montoya, Colombian race car driver
  1975   – Jason Robinson, American saxophonist and composer 
1976 – Ainsley Earhardt, American political commentator
1977 – Chris Mooney, American journalist and academic
1978 – Jason Bay, Canadian-American baseball player
  1978   – Patrizio Buanne, Austrian-Italian singer-songwriter and producer
  1978   – Héctor Camacho Jr., Puerto Rican-American boxer
  1978   – Dante Hall, American football player
  1978   – Scott Minto, Australian rugby league player
1980 – Vladimir Karpets, Russian cyclist
1981 – Feliciano López, Spanish tennis player
  1981   – David McMillan, American football player (d. 2013)
  1981   – Ryan Tandy, Australian rugby league player (d. 2014)
  1981   – Jordan Tata, American baseball player
1982 – Jason Bacashihua, American ice hockey player
  1982   – Aaron Burkart, German race car driver
  1982   – Brian Fortuna, American dancer and choreographer
  1982   – Inna Osypenko-Radomska, Ukrainian-born sprint kayaker
  1982   – Sexy Star, Mexican wrestler
  1982   – Athanasios Tsigas, Greek footballer
1983 – Freya Ross, Scottish runner 
  1983   – Ángel Sánchez, Puerto Rican-American baseball player
1984 – Brian Joubert, French figure skater
1985 – Ian Desmond, American baseball player
  1985   – Mami Yamasaki, Japanese model and actress
1986 – Hayato Fujita, Japanese wrestler
  1986   – Aldis Hodge, American actor
  1986   – İbrahim Kaş, Turkish footballer
  1986   – Jason Nightingale, New Zealand rugby league player
1987 – Gain, South Korean singer
  1987   – Jack Lawless, American drummer 
  1987   – Tito Tebaldi, Italian rugby player
1988 – Sergei Bobrovsky, Russian ice hockey player
  1988   – Khabib Nurmagomedov, Russian mixed martial artist
  1988   – Ayano Ōmoto, Japanese singer and dancer 
  1988   – Ryan Simpkins, Australian rugby league player
1990 – Phillip Phillips, American singer-songwriter and guitarist
  1990   – John Tavares, Canadian ice hockey player
1991 – Isaac Cofie, Ghanaian footballer
1992 – Michał Żyro, Polish footballer
  1993   – Julian Draxler, German footballer
1995 – Laura Dekker, Dutch sailor
  1995   – Rob Holding, English footballer
1996 – Ioana Loredana Roșca, Romanian tennis player

Deaths

Pre-1600
 855 – Gozbald, bishop of Würzburg
1085 – Hermann II, Count Palatine of Lotharingia (b. 1049)
1190 – Adelog of Hildesheim, German bishop
1241 – Conrad II of Salzwedel, German nobleman and bishop
1246 – Michael of Chernigov (b. 1185)
1266 – Jan Prandota, Bishop of Kraków
1328 – Ibn Taymiyyah, Syrian theologian and scholar (b. 1263)
1384 – Louis I, Duke of Anjou (b. 1339)
1440 – Frederick I, Elector of Brandenburg (b. 1371)
1460 – Gilles Binchois, Flemish composer (b. 1400)
1492 – Anne Neville, Countess of Warwick (b. 1426)
1501 – Agostino Barbarigo, Doge of Venice
  1501   – Thomas Grey, 1st Marquess of Dorset, stepson of Edward IV of England (b. 1457)
1533 – Veit Stoss, German sculptor (b. c. 1447)
1537 – Pavle Bakić, medieval Serb monarch; last Serb Despot
1565 – Cipriano de Rore, Flemish composer and teacher (b. 1515)
1586 – Sir Anthony Babington, English Catholic conspirator (b. 1561)
  1586   – Chidiock Tichborne, English conspirator and poet (b. 1558)
1590 – Lodovico Agostini, Italian priest, composer, and scholar (b. 1534)

1601–1900
1625 – Heinrich Meibom, German historian and poet (b. 1555)
1627 – Jan Gruter, Dutch scholar and critic (b. 1560)
1639 – Johannes Meursius, Dutch historian and scholar (b. 1579)
1643 – Lucius Cary, 2nd Viscount Falkland, English soldier and politician, Secretary of State for England (b. 1610)
1684 – Kim Seok-ju, Korean scholar and politician (b. 1634)
1793 – Fletcher Christian, English lieutenant and mutineer (b. 1764)
1803 – Robert Emmet, Irish republican (b. 1780)
1815 – Nicolas Desmarest, French geologist and scholar (b. 1725)
1839 – Sir Thomas Hardy, 1st Baronet, English admiral (b. 1769)
1840 – José Gaspar Rodríguez de Francia, Paraguayan lawyer and politician, Consul of Paraguay (b. 1766)
1845 – Matvei Gedenschtrom, Russian explorer and public servant (b. 1780)
1852 – Philander Chase, American bishop and educator, founded Kenyon College (b. 1775)
1855 – José Trinidad Reyes, Honduran priest and educator (b. 1797)
1863 – Jacob Grimm, German philologist and mythologist (b. 1785)
1884 – Leopold Fitzinger, Austrian zoologist and author (b. 1802)
1898 – Theodor Fontane, German author and poet (b. 1819)

1901–present
1906 – Robert R. Hitt, American politician, 13th United States Assistant Secretary of State (b. 1834)
1908 – Pablo de Sarasate, Spanish violinist and composer (b. 1844)
1927 – George Nichols, American actor, director, and screenwriter (b. 1864)
1930 – Gombojab Tsybikov, Russian anthropologist and explorer (b. 1873)
1932 – Francisco S. Carvajal, Mexican lawyer and politician, president 1914 (b. 1870)
1933 – Annie Besant, English theosophist and activist (b. 1847)
1939 – Paul Bruchési, Canadian archbishop (b. 1855)
1945 – Augusto Tasso Fragoso, Brazilian politician, President of Brazil (b. 1869)
  1945   – William Seabrook, American occultist, journalist, and explorer (b. 1884)
  1945   – Eduard Wirths, German physician (b. 1909)
1947 – Fiorello H. La Guardia, American lawyer and politician, 99th Mayor of New York City (b. 1882)
  1947   – Jantina Tammes, Dutch biologist, geneticist, and academic (b. 1871)
1957 – Heino Kaski, Finnish pianist and composer (b. 1885)
  1957   – Jean Sibelius, Finnish violinist and composer (b. 1865)
1970 – Alexandros Othonaios, Greek general and politician, 126h Prime Minister of Greece (b. 1879)
1971 – Giorgos Seferis, Greek poet and diplomat, Nobel Prize laureate (b. 1900)
  1971   – James Westerfield, American actor (b. 1913)
1972 – Pierre-Henri Simon, French historian and author (b. 1903)
1973 – Jim Croce, American singer-songwriter and guitarist (b. 1943)
1975 – Saint-John Perse, French poet and diplomat, Nobel Prize laureate (b. 1887)
1979 – Ludvík Svoboda, Czech general and politician, 8th President of Czechoslovakia (b. 1895)
1984 – Steve Goodman, American singer-songwriter and guitarist (b. 1948)
1987 – Michael Stewart, American playwright and composer (b. 1924)
1993 – Erich Hartmann, German soldier and pilot (b. 1922)
1994 – Abioseh Nicol, Sierra Leonean physician, academic, and diplomat (b. 1924)
  1994   – Jule Styne, American composer (b. 1905)
1996 – Paul Erdős, Hungarian-Polish mathematician and academic (b. 1913)
  1996   – Reuben Kamanga, Zambian politician, 1st Vice-President of Zambia (b. 1929)
  1996   – Paul Weston, American pianist, composer, and conductor (b. 1912)
1999 – Robert Lebel, Canadian businessman (b. 1905)
2000 – Gherman Titov, Russian general, pilot, and astronaut (b. 1935)
2002 – Sergei Bodrov Jr., Russian actor, director, and screenwriter (b. 1971)
2003 – Simon Muzenda, Zimbabwean politician, 1st Vice-President of Zimbabwe (b. 1922)
  2003   – Gareth Williams, Baron Williams of Mostyn, Welsh lawyer and politician, Lord President of the Council (b. 1941)
2004 – Brian Clough, English footballer and manager (b. 1935)
  2004   – Townsend Hoopes, American soldier and historian (b. 1922)
2005 – Simon Wiesenthal, Austrian human rights activist, Holocaust survivor (b. 1908)
2006 – Armin Jordan, Swiss conductor (b. 1932)
  2006   – Sven Nykvist, Swedish director, producer, and cinematographer (b. 1922)
  2006   – John W. Peterson, American pilot and songwriter (b. 1921)
2007 – Johnny Gavin, Irish footballer (b. 1928)
2010 – Leonard Skinner, American soldier and educator (b. 1933)
2011 – Oscar Handlin, American historian and author (b. 1915)
  2011   – Burhanuddin Rabbani, Afghan academic and politician, 10th President of Afghanistan (b. 1940)
2012 – Fortunato Baldelli, Italian cardinal (b. 1935)
  2012   – Richard H. Cracroft, American author and academic (b. 1936)
  2012   – Tereska Torrès, French soldier and author (b. 1920)
2013 – James B. Vaught, American general (b. 1926)
  2013   – Gilles Verlant, Belgian journalist and critic (b. 1957)
2014 – Anatoly Berezovoy, Russian colonel, pilot, and cosmonaut (b. 1942)
  2014   – Polly Bergen, American actress and singer (b. 1930)
  2014   – Takako Doi, Japanese scholar and politician (b. 1928)
  2014   – George Sluizer, French-Dutch director, producer, and screenwriter (b. 1932)
2015 – Mario Caiano, Italian director, producer, and screenwriter (b. 1933)
  2015   – Jagmohan Dalmiya, Indian businessman (b. 1940)
  2015   – Jack Larson, American actor (b. 1928)
2016 – Curtis Hanson, American film director and screenwriter (b. 1945)
  2016   – Peter Leo Gerety, American bishop (b. 1912)

Holidays and observances
 Christian feast day:
 Agapitus (Western Christianity)
 Eustace (Western Christianity)
 Evilasius
 Fausta of Cyzicus
 Glycerius of Milan
 Jean-Charles Cornay (one of Vietnamese Martyrs)
 John Coleridge Patteson (commemoration, Anglicanism)
 José Maria de Yermo y Parres
 Korean Martyrs, including Andrew Kim Taegon and Laurent-Marie-Joseph Imbert
 Theodore, Philippa and companions
 Vincent Madelgarius (Maelceadar)
 September 20 (Eastern Orthodox liturgics)
 Constitution Day (Nepal)
 Independence Day of South Ossetia (not fully recognized)
 National Youth Day (Thailand)
 Oil Workers' Day (Azerbaijan)
 Universal Children's Day (Germany)

References

External links

 
 
 

Days of the year
September